Takako Shirai (白井貴子 Shirai Takako, Korean: 윤정순, Hanja: 尹貞順, born 18 July 1952 in Okayama City) is a former volleyball player from Japan, who was a member of the Japan Women's National Team that won the gold medal at the 1976 Summer Olympics.

In 2000, she became an inductee of the Volleyball Hall of Fame in Holyoke, Massachusetts.

National team
1972: 2nd place in the Olympic Games of Munich
1974: 1st place in the World Championship
1976: 1st place in the Olympic Games of Montreal

References

1952 births
Living people
Japanese women's volleyball players
Japanese people of Korean descent
Volleyball players at the 1972 Summer Olympics
Volleyball players at the 1976 Summer Olympics
Olympic volleyball players of Japan
Olympic gold medalists for Japan
Olympic silver medalists for Japan
Naturalized citizens of Japan
Sportspeople from Okayama
Olympic medalists in volleyball
Asian Games medalists in volleyball
Volleyball players at the 1970 Asian Games
Volleyball players at the 1974 Asian Games
Medalists at the 1970 Asian Games
Medalists at the 1974 Asian Games
Asian Games gold medalists for Japan
Medalists at the 1976 Summer Olympics
Medalists at the 1972 Summer Olympics